The  is a Japanese railway line between Gifu Station in Gifu and Toyama Station in Toyama, operated by Central Japan Railway Company (JR Central) and West Japan Railway Company (JR West). The line directly links the Chūkyō Metropolitan Area (metropolitan Nagoya) and Hokuriku region in a shorter distance, but with a longer travel time, than by using the combination of the Tōkaidō Shinkansen and Hokuriku Main Line. Now the line primarily functions as a way to access the scenic areas of Hida (ancient Hida Province), in the rugged mountains of northern Gifu Prefecture, such as Gero onsen (hot spring), Takayama, Shirakawa-gō, and the Kiso River. The whole line was completed in 1934.

Basic data
Operators, distances:
Total distance: 
Central Japan Railway Company (Category 1)
Gifu - Inotani: 
West Japan Railway Company (Category 1)
Inotani - Toyama: 
Japan Freight Railway Company (Category 2)
Inotani - Toyama: 36.6 km
Railway signalling:
Gifu - Inotani: Automatic
Inotani - Toyama: Special Automatic, a simplified automatic system
CTC center:
Gifu - Inotani: Tōkai Operation Control Center
Inotani - Toyama: Kanazawa Operation Control Center

Services
The Hida limited express train operates between Nagoya and Takayama, Hida-Furukawa, and Toyama, with ten return services a day, and between Ōsaka and Takayama with one return service a day, with trains to and from Nagoya reversing direction at Gifu en route.

The line is generally divided to three parts for local services: between Gifu and Takayama; between Takayama and Inotani; and between Inotani and Toyama. There are roughly two trains per one hour between Gifu and Mino-Ōta, while there is no local train for four hours between Gero and Takayama.

Stations

Passing loops

Hisuikyō
In Hichisō, Gifu.

Washibara
In Shirakawa, Gifu. 
()

Fukurai
In Gero, Gifu. 
()

Shōgano
In Gero, Gifu. 
()

Rolling stock

JR Central
 KiHa 75 series DMUs
 KiHa 85 series DMUs (Hida limited express services)
 HC85 series hybrid Diesel-Electric multiple units (Hida limited express services)
 KiHa 25 series DMUs (from March 2015)

JR West
 KiHa 120-300 DMUs

Former rolling stock
 KiHa 11 series DMUs (until March 2015)
 KiHa 40 series DMUs (until June 2015)

From the start of the March 2015 timetable revision, JR Central KiHa 25 series diesel multiple unit (DMU) trains displaced from the Taketoyo Line were phased in on Takayama Line services, with the last remaining KiHa 40 series DMU trains withdrawn from the line on 30 June 2015.

History
The Gifu to Mino-Ota section opened in 1920, and the line was then extended in sections, opening to Gero in 1930 and Hida-Osaka in 1933. At the northern end the first section from Toyama opened in 1927, reached Inotani in 1930 and Takayama and Hida-Osaka in 1934, completing the line.

CTC signalling was commissioned in 1968, and in 1980, a ground-breaking ceremony was held at Takayama for the proposed electrification of the line, but the program was cancelled later that year before any significant work was undertaken. Freight services ceased on the line in 2007.

Between 2004 and September 8, 2007, the section between Tsunogawa Station and Inotani Station was closed due to flood damage from Typhoon Tokage.

Former connecting lines
 Hida-Osaka Station: The  gauge Kosaka Forest railway commenced operation in 1933, and by 1953 consisted of seven lines with a total length of 65 km. Line closures commenced in 1954, and the system closed in 1971.
 Inotani Station: The  24 km line to Kamioka-Cho (which was opened in 1910 by the local government from Sasazu station) was acquired by the Mitsui Mining Co. in 1927. In 1931, a 2 km line to alter the connection to Inotani Station opened (with the 16 km section providing the Sasazu connection closing at the same time) and an 8 km branch opened in 1937, connecting to the  gauge Sugoroku-Kanakida Forest railway (which consisted of a 16 km main line and three branches between 3 and 6 km in length, and operated from 1930 to 1963). Passenger services ceased in 1962, and the mine and railway closed in 1967.
 Sasazu Station: As mentioned above, the 610 mm gauge 24 km line to Kamioka-Cho operated from 1910 until altered to connect at Inotani station in 1931. The Toyama Railway operated a 12 km line to Minami-Toyama between 1914 and 1933. In 1943, the Toyama Electric Railway reopened the line, electrified at 600 V DC, and operated it until 1975. The 20 km Kamioka Line to Okuhida-Onsenguchi opened in 1966. Freight services ceased in 1981, and the line closed in 2006.

See also
List of railway lines in Japan

References

 
Lines of Central Japan Railway Company
Lines of West Japan Railway Company
Rail transport in Gifu Prefecture
Rail transport in Toyama Prefecture
Railway lines opened in 1920
1067 mm gauge railways in Japan